Nixon Darlanio Reis Cardoso (born 20 June 1992), simply known as Nixon, is a Brazilian footballer who plays as a forward who plays for Juazeirense.

Career

Flamengo
Nixon made his professional debut for Flamengo against Ponte Preta in round 20 of the 2012 Campeonato Brasileiro. He scored his first goal in the final match of the season against Botafogo. At the start of 2015, Nixon's contract with Flamengo was renewed through 2018. In March he underwent surgery to correct the patellar tendon in his left knee. In July he ruptured the same tendon, ruling him out for the remainder of the season.

América (MG) (loan)
On 19 July 2016 Nixon signed with América (MG) on loan until the end of the season after spending more than 18 months on the sidelines due to serious injuries. Nixon did not score for the club, who were relegated at the end of the 2016 Série A season.

Red Bull Brasil (loan)
On 11 January 2017 Nixon signed on loan with Red Bull Brasil for the 2017 São Paulo State League.

ABC (loan)
On 25 July 2017, Nixon moved to ABC on loan for the club's Série B season.

Kalmar (loan)
On 5 January 2018, Nixon transferred on loan from Flamengo to the Swedish club Kalmar FF. At the end of 2018, Flamengo did not renew his contract and Nixon was released as a free agent.

Mosta
After a spell at Portuguesa-RJ back in Brazil, Nixon joined Maltese Premier League club Mosta on 22 August 2020.

Career statistics
(Correct )

Honours
Flamengo
Copa do Brasil: 2013
Campeonato Carioca: 2014

References

External links

Living people
1992 births
Sportspeople from Bahia
Brazilian footballers
Brazilian expatriate footballers
Association football forwards
Campeonato Brasileiro Série A players
Campeonato Brasileiro Série B players
Campeonato Brasileiro Série D players
Allsvenskan players
Maltese Premier League players
Armenian Premier League players
CR Flamengo footballers
América Futebol Clube (MG) players
Red Bull Brasil players
ABC Futebol Clube players
Kalmar FF players
Associação Atlética Portuguesa (RJ) players
Mosta F.C. players
FC Alashkert players
Sociedade Desportiva Juazeirense players
Brazilian expatriate sportspeople in Sweden
Brazilian expatriate sportspeople in Malta
Brazilian expatriate sportspeople in Armenia
Expatriate footballers in Sweden
Expatriate footballers in Malta
Expatriate footballers in Armenia